The Wedding Ring (Zin'naariyâ!) is a 2016 Nigerien drama film directed by Rahmatou Keïta. It was selected as the Nigerien entry for the Best Foreign Language Film at the 91st Academy Awards, but it was not nominated. It was the first film to be submitted by Niger in the Foreign Language Oscar category.

Cast
 Magaajyia Silberfeld as Tiyaa
 Salamatou Kimba Farinwata
 Harouna Amoud
 Yazi Dogo
 Ali Nuhu
 Mariam Kaba

See also
 List of submissions to the 91st Academy Awards for Best Foreign Language Film
 List of Nigerien submissions for the Academy Award for Best Foreign Language Film

References

External links
 

2016 films
2016 drama films
Nigerien drama films
Zarma-language films
Hausa-language films
Fula-language films